Pieter Marinus "Piet" Blauw (30 September 1937 – 16 May 2019) was a Dutch politician for the People's Party for Freedom and Democracy (VVD). He was born in Alkmaar, North Holland and was a farmer by profession. Blauw was elected to the House of Representatives in 1981, serving until 1998.

Blauw died on 16 May 2019 in Veendam, Groningen, at the age of 81.

References

1937 births
2019 deaths
Dutch farmers
Members of the House of Representatives (Netherlands)
People from Alkmaar
People's Party for Freedom and Democracy politicians